Ria Schiffner (born 5 March 1996) is a German ice dancer. With partner Julian Salatzki, she is the 2013 German national junior silver medalist and finished 16th at the 2014 World Junior Championships.

Programs 
(with Salatzki)

Competitive highlights 
(with Salatzki)

References

External links 
 

1996 births
German female ice dancers
Living people
Figure skaters from Berlin